BikeMi is a public bicycle sharing system in Milan, Italy. It was launched on 8 December 2008 and is contracted to and operated by Clear Channel on the basis of its SmartBike system. The scheme encompasses 4,650 bicycles (including 1,000 electric bicycles and bikes for children) and 325 stations.

Service
The service is active every day from 7a.m. to midnight and had a daily ridership of about 15,890 in 2013. The operating hours are sometimes extended for special events.

Rates
The system is based on 1-day, 1-week or 1-year subscriptions, which allows users to rent a bike. Rentals are free for the first 30 minutes (3 for electric bikes). After that time, in order not to pay more, the bike has to be returned in a station. However, unlimited number of rentals are allowed in a day. The scheme is similar to the Vélib' one. As of November 2015 there are 43,213 users with an annual subscription.

Prices range from €4.50 for a 1-day subscription to €36 for the annual one. An additional rental fee is charged, which varies depending on whether a pedal-powered or electric bike is used.

Electric bikes are free for the first 3 minutes. A €0.25 per half hour fee is then charged. This fee doubles every half hour, until 2 hours, where a fixed fee of €4.00 per hour is paid.

Pedal powered bikes are free for the first 30 minutes. A €0.50 per half hour fee is then charged rentals not exceeding 2 hours. After this, the rate rises to €2.00 per hour.

See also 

 List of bicycle sharing systems

Notes and references

External links 

 

Community bicycle programs
Transport in Milan
Bicycle sharing in Italy